, nicknamed "Yassan", is a professional Japanese baseball player. He plays infielder for the Chiba Lotte Marines.

References

External links

 NPB.com

1993 births
Living people
Chiba Lotte Marines players
Nippon Professional Baseball infielders
Baseball people from Osaka Prefecture
People from Suita
Criollos de Caguas players
Japanese expatriate baseball players in Puerto Rico